Charlie Ostrem (born October 12, 1999) is an American professional soccer player who plays as a left-back for MLS Next Pro club Chicago Fire II.

Early career

Youth
Ostrem attended Shorewood High School, whilst playing club soccer with Seattle United and Washington Crossfire, where he won the State Cup with Seattle and was a two-time Surf Cup champion.

College & amateur
In 2018, Ostrem attended the University of Washington to play college soccer. In four seasons with the Huskies, Ostrem made 75 appearances, scoring four goals and tallying 22 assists. While at college, Ostrem he earned All-American and 2020-21 PAC-12 Defensive Player of the Year honors following a strong junior campaign, and also achieved All PAC-12 First Team recognition. 

While at college, Ostrem also appeared for Crossfire Redmond during the NPSL 2019 season, where he netted six times in eight regular season games.

Professional career

Chicago Fire II
On January 11, 2022, Ostrem was selected 33rd overall in the 2022 MLS SuperDraft by Chicago Fire. He signed with the club's MLS Next Pro side Chicago Fire II on March 9, 2022.

References

External links

1999 births
Living people
American soccer players
Association football defenders
Chicago Fire FC draft picks
Major League Soccer players
MLS Next Pro players
National Premier Soccer League players
Soccer players from Washington (state)
Washington Crossfire players
Washington Huskies men's soccer players
Chicago Fire FC II players
People from Shoreline, Washington
Sportspeople from King County, Washington